The Ghana Cocoa Board (COCOBOD) is a Ghanaian government-controlled institution that fixes the buying price for cocoa in Ghana. Farmers are protected from the volatile prices on the world market through the price-fixing. Besides the higher quality hybrid seeds are sold by the organization and some research on cocoa plant-related diseases are also carried out.

Between 1947 and 1979, the institution was known as the Cocoa Marketing Board.

History

Background
In 1937, farmers in Gold Coast, a colony of the British Empire equal to contemporary Ghana, refused to continue selling cocoa at the low prices set by European merchants and decided to withhold cocoa from the market. The strike went on for 8 months, until the British government acted by setting up the Nowell Commission of Enquiry to investigate the issue. The Nowell Commission report advised the government to assist cocoa farmers by establishing a Marketing Board.

West African Produce Control Board (1940-1946)
In 1940, the government established the West African Produce Control Board to purchase cocoa under guaranteed prices from all West African countries. It operated throughout World War II and was dissolved in 1946.

Cocoa Marketing Board (1947-1979)
The first attempt to regulate market value and production was in 1947 through the Ghana Marketing Board, which dissolved in 1979 and was reconciled into Ghana Cocoa Board also called Cocobod . The Ghana Marketing Board was established by ordinance in 1947 with the sum of 27 million Ghanaian Cedi as its initial working capital. In 1979, this Board was dissolved and reconstituted as the Ghana Cocoa Board.

Ghana Cocoa Board (1979-)
In 1984 Cocobod underwent institutional reform aimed at subjecting the cocoa sector to market forces. Cocobod's role was reduced, and 40 percent of its staff, or at least 35,000 employees, were dismissed. Furthermore, the government shifted responsibility for crop transport to the private sector. Subsidies for production inputs (fertilizers, insecticides, fungicides, and equipment) were removed, and there was a measure of privatization of the processing sector through at least one joint venture. In addition, a new payment system known as the Akuafo Check System was introduced in 1982 at the point of purchase of dried beans.

Ghana's Government implemented a very strategic plan in 1984 putting the sale of agriculture particularly Cocoa in the hands of the Government. With the regulation of pricing and manufacturing controlled by the government over 30,000+ jobs were lost but Ghana still holds its spot as one of three highest yielding countries of Cocoa.

Jointly with Côte d'Ivoire's Coffee and Cocoa Council (both countries were enemies for years), agreed and announced, on June 11, 2019, a minimal price for cocoa, in order to protect producers. 
 
In 2018, Ghana and Côte d’Ivoire set up a cartel called Cocoa Initiative, often described as OPEC for cocoa and thus dubbed "COPEC".

Heads of COCOBOD 
 A.C. Mills - General Manager - 1 October 1947 - December 1948
 A.E. Hampson - General Manager-  1 October 1949 - 25 May 1955
 J.A.E. Morley - Managing Director - 6 March 1953 - March 1956
 Harry Dodoo - General Manager - 25 March 1955 - 28 February 1965
 Harry Dodoo - Managing Director - 1 May 1965 - 22 February 1967 
 Frederick Robert Kankam-Boadu - Acting Managing Director - 23 February 1967 - 14 May 1968 
 Frederick Robert Kankam-Boadu - Managing Director - 14 May 1968 - 1 October 1968 
 Uriah Kwesi Hackman - Managing Director - 1 November 1968 - 9 October 1969
 J.G. Amoafo - Managing Director - 21 May 1970 - 27 January 1972
 Uriah Kwesi Hackman - Executive Chairman- 28 January 1972 - 31 August 1973
 Lt. Col. Kwaku A. Takyi - Executive Chairman- 20 December 1973 - 19 February 1975 
 Cdr. J.C. Addo - Managing Director- 20 February 1975 - 31 July 1978
 Andrews Kwame Pianim - Chief Executive - 1 August 1978 - 4 October 1979
 Mumuni Bawumia - Interim Chairman - 5 October 1979 - 30 September 1981 
 Mumuni Bawumia - Chief Executive - 1 October 1981 - 10 January 1982 
 Kwame Gyamfi - Chief Executive - 11 January 1982 - 25 August 1983
 Harry Dodoo - Chief Executive - 7 October 1983 - 17 September 1986
 K.N. Owusu - Chief Executive - 17 September 1986 - 28 December 1989 
 David Aninakwa - Chief Executive - 28 December 1989 - 16 January 1996
 Flt. Lt. Joseph Atiemo -  Chief Executive - 4 September 1993 - 3 September 1996
 John Henry Newman - Chief Executive - 3 September 1996 - 2001
 S.K. Appah - Acting Chief Executive - 2001
 Isaac Osei - Chief Executive - April 2006 - December 2008
 Anthony Fofie - Chief Executive - 16 Dec 2008-30 Nov 2013
 Stephen Kwabena Opuni - Chief Executive - 30 Nov 2013-13 Jan 2017
 Joseph Boahen Aidoo - Chief Executive - 13 Jan 2017-

Buying of fertilizers from Ghanaian companies 
In September 2019, COCOBOD was given a directive by the government of Ghana to buy fertilizers from local manufacturers from 2020. Due to the government's One-district One-factory venture, the local fertilizer production firms had the requisite capacity the demand of the country.

Subsidiaries
Cocoa Research Institute of Ghana
Seed Production Division
Cocoa Health and Extension Division
Quality Control Company
Cocoa Marketing Company

See also
Cocoa production in Ghana
Agriculture in Ghana
Canada Wheat Board, a similar monopoly board that existed in Canada

References

External links
 Ghana Cocoa Board

Cocoa production
Agricultural organisations based in Ghana
Marketing boards